Winninowie may refer to:
Winninowie, South Australia, a locality south of Port Augusta
Winninowie Conservation Park, on the coast in the locality of Miranda, south of Winninowie
Hundred of Winninowie, a cadastral division that includes Miranda and Nectar Brook